Arhavi District is a district of Artvin Province of Turkey. Its seat is the town Arhavi. Its area is 407 km2, and its population is 21,661 (2021).

Composition
There is one municipality in Arhavi District:
 Arhavi

There are 30 villages in Arhavi District:

 Arılı
 Aşağışahinler
 Balıklı
 Başköy
 Boyuncuk
 Derecik
 Dereüstü
 Dikyamaç
 Dülgerli
 Güneşli
 Güngören
 Gürgencik
 Kavak
 Kemerköprü
 Kestanealan
 Kireçlik
 Konaklı
 Küçükköy
 Ortacalar
 Şenköy
 Sırtoba
 Soğucak
 Tepeyurt
 Üçırmak
 Üçler
 Ulaş
 Ulukent
 Yıldızlı
 Yolgeçen
 Yukarışahinler

References

Districts of Artvin Province